This is a list of aviation-related events from 2009.

Deadliest crash
The deadliest crash of this year was Air France Flight 447, an Airbus A330 which crashed in the mid-Atlantic Ocean on 1 June, killing all 228 people on board.

Events
During the year, the airlines Aeromak, City Link Air, FlyMontserrat, KentuckySkies, Mint Airways, and Trawel Fly are established, the airlines Air Arabia Maroc, Arik Niger, and Nile Air commence flight operations, and Sol Dominicana Airlines ceases operations.

January
The Kiribati airline Coral Sun Airways is established.
 The Federal Aviation Administration revokes the Operating Certificate of American airline Air Tahoma.

4 January
 A Caribair Cessna 550 Citation II (N815MA) is substantially damaged at Wilmington International Airport, United States when it makes a wheels-up landing after running out of fuel.
 A Sikorsky S-76C helicopter strikes a red-tailed hawk seven minutes after taking off from Amelia, Louisiana, on a charter flight to an offshore oil platform in the Gulf of Mexico and crashes, killing its pilot and copilot and six of their seven passengers.

5 January
 C-GEAJ, an Antarctic Logistic Center International Basler BT-67, crashes on landing at Tony Camp, Antarctica. All four occupants survive but the aircraft is damaged beyond repair.

6 January
 Ted, a brand of the American airline United Airlines for their economy flights, is discontinued. Economy flights are rebranded under the main United Airlines brand.

9 January
 EP-858, a Peruvian Army Cessna Grand Caravan crashes on take-off from Rio Tigre, Intutu Region.

10 January
 The Zambian airline Zambian Airways suspends operations.

11 January
 Zest Airways Flight 895, an AVIC I MA-60, registration RP-C8893, crashes on landing at Godofredo P. Ramos Airport, Philippines, hitting an airport building. Over twenty people are injured and the aircraft is damaged beyond repair.

13 January
 S9-KAS, an Antonov An-24RV operated by Daallo Airlines, lands at Bender Qassim International Airport, Somalia with the nose landing gear retracted.

15 January

 Two Ilyushin Il-76 aircraft of the Russian Air Force collide on the ground at Uytash Airport, Makhachkala, Dagestan killing four of the seven crew.
US Airways Flight 1549, an Airbus A320-214 (N106US) with 155 people aboard flies into a flock of Canada geese just after takeoff from New York Citys LaGuardia Airport and ditches in the Hudson River after both engines are disabled by birdstrikes. All passengers and crew are rescued, and only five people are injured.

17 January
 A Eurocopter AS 532 helicopter of the French Navy crashes into the sea off Gabon shortly after take-off from the amphibious assault ship , killing eight of the ten personnel on board.
 The bankrupt Lithuanian airline FlyLal-Lithuanian Airlines ceases operations.

19 January
 Iran Air flight 498, a Fokker 100, registration EP-CFN, suffers a collapse of the right main landing gear during landing at Mehrabad Airport and is substantially damaged.

20 January
 The Dominican Civil Aviation Institute suspends Caribair from operating for "operational irregularities".

25 January
 The operating licence of Swedish airline Nordic Airways is suspended, the Swedish Transport Agency stating that the airline is "no longer able to fulfill its commitments and duties to its passengers."

27 January
 FedEx Express Flight 8284 operated by Empire Airlines, an ATR 42-320-Cargo, registration N902FX, crashes short of the runway at Lubbock Preston Smith International Airport in the United States, and is destroyed in the subsequent fire.
 OEGAA, a Cessna Citation V operating as the Tyrol Air Ambulance is substantially damaged in a belly landing at Tolmachevo Airport Russia.

29 January
The Australian airline MacAir Airlines enters voluntary administration and ceases operations.

30 January

United States Air Force C-17A Globemaster III 06-0002 makes a belly landing at Bagram Air Base, Afghanistan.

February
The British airline Skysouth ceases operations.

4 February
 N834TP, a Douglas Aero Modified Turbo DC-3 operated by the National Test Pilot School is involved in a take-off accident at Mojave Air & Space Port, United States, and substantially damaged.
 C-FCCE, a DHC-6 Twin Otter 100 operated by Transwest Air, crashes on take-off from La Ronge (Barber Field) Airport, Canada and is substantially damaged.

7 February
 PT-SEA, an Embraer EMB 110-P1 Bandeirante operated by Manaus Aerotáxi, crashes into the Manacapuru River, Brazil killing 24 of the 28 people on board.

11 February
Two Grob Tutor aircraft of the United Kingdom's Royal Air Force collide mid-air over Porthcawl, Wales. Both aircraft crash, killing all occupants.

12 February
Colgan Air Flight 3407, a DHC-8-402 Q400, registration N200WQ, crashes at Clarence Center, New York killing all 50 people on board and another on the ground.

13 February
BA CityFlyer Flight 8456, an Avro RJ100, registration G-BXAR, is substantially damaged when the nosewheel collapses on landing at London City Airport. All 71 people on board are successfully evacuated via emergency chutes.

14 February
N440RA, a CASA C-212 Aviocar operated by Arctic Transportation Services lands short of the runway at Ralph Wien Memorial Airport, Alaska and is significantly damaged.

16 February
90-09, a HESA IrAn-140 operated by the Iranian Police crashes on approach to Isfahan International Airport, Iran and is destroyed, killing all five people on board.
TC-SGD, a Boeing 737-48E operated by Air Algérie overruns the runway at In Aménas Airport, Algeria after landing in a  tailwind, and is substantially damaged. A number of people are injured in the subsequent evacuation.

18 February
 PNC-0211, a Basler BT-67 operated by Policía Nacional de Colombia is destroyed at Olaya Herrera Airport, Colombia, by the detonation of a mishandled hand grenade.
FAC 1670, a Basler BT-67 operated by Fuerza Aérea Colombiana crashes shortly after take-off from Olaya Herrera Airport, killing all five people on board. The aircraft is destroyed.
N652UA, a Boeing 767-322ER operated by United Airlines, is damaged significantly by the automatic discharge of a sprinkler system in the hangar it is parked in while undergoing maintenance at O'Hare International Airport, Chicago. Eleven cabin windows are knocked out by the force of the discharge, damaging the aircraft's avionics systems.

20 February
Aerolift Flight 1015, an Antonov AN-12, registration S9-SVN, crashes shortly after take-off from Luxor International Airport, Egypt, killing all five crew. The aircraft is destroyed.

22 February
The Australian airline SkyAirWorld suspends operations pending a restructure of its business.

23 February
Lion Air Flight 972, a McDonnell Douglas MD-90-30, registration PK-LIO, lands at Hang Nadim Airport, Indonesia, with the nosewheel stuck in the raised position. The aircraft is damaged significantly.

25 February

Turkish Airlines Flight 1951 a Boeing 737-8F2, registration TC-JGE, crashes short of the runway at Schiphol Airport, Amsterdam. Six passengers and three crew members are killed.

28 February
 Carpatair Flight 128, a Saab 2000, registration YR-SBI, lands at Traian Vuia International Airport, Romania, with the nosewheel stuck in the raised position. An emergency landing is successfully made on a partially foamed runway. The nose area of the aircraft is damaged.
 Atlantic Southeast Airlines Flight 5563, a Canadair CRJ-200ER, registration N830AS, suffers a fire on the ground at Tallahassee Regional Airport, United States. The crew evacuate, and the fire is extinguished after burning through the cockpit wall, the flight deck being significantly damaged.

March
 Iraqi Airways begins its first service to Sweden since the outbreak of the Gulf War in January 1991, flying from Baghdad to Athens to Stockholm using a Boeing 737-2300 leased from Seagle Air.
 Continental Airlines becomes the first U.S. airline to inaugurate scheduled service to Shanghai, China, offering daily nonstop flights from the airline's hub at Newark Liberty International Airport in New Jersey.

3 March
 Perimeter Aviation Flight 460, a Swearingen SA-226TC Metroliner, registration C-FSLZ, makes a wheels-up landing at Winnipeg James Armstrong Richardson International Airport, Canada. The same aircraft had an unsafe gear indication the previous day.

6 March
 VT-XRM, an NAL Saras prototype operated by the National Aerospace Laboratory, crashes  from Bengaluru International Airport, India, killing all three crew members.

9 March
 Lion Air Flight 793, a McDonnell Douglas MD-90-30, registration PK-LIL, departs the runway at Soekarno-Hatta International Airport, Indonesia, and spins through 180°. All 172 people on board are evacuated safely but the aircraft is damaged beyond economic repair.
 S9-SAB, an Ilyushin IL-76TD operated by Aerolift, crashes into Lake Victoria shortly after take-off from Entebbe International Airport, Uganda, killing all 11 people on board. The aircraft is destroyed.

12 March
 Cougar Helicopters Flight 91, a Sikorsky S-92A, registration C-GZCH, ditches in the Atlantic Ocean off Canada, killing 17 of the 18 people on board.

13 March
The Mexican airline MexicanaLink commences operations.

19 March
 A Beechcraft B200 King Air of the Ecuadorian Air Force crashes at Guápulo while attempting to land at Mariscal Sucre International Airport in thick fog, killing all five people on board and a further two on the ground.

20 March
Emirates Airline Flight 407, an Airbus A340-500, registration A6-ERG, suffers a tailstrike during its take-off run at Melbourne Airport, Australia. The damaged aircraft dumps fuel and makes a safe landing at Melbourne. The investigation found that an incorrect weight value was entered into the aircraft's computer, resulting in an incorrect calculated take-off speed.

22 March
 N128CM, a Pilatus PC-12, crashes near Butte, Montana, killing all 14 people on board.

23 March
 FedEx Express Flight 80, a McDonnell-Douglas MD-11F, registration N562FE, crashes on landing at Narita International Airport, Tokyo, killing both crew members.
 Dniproavia Flight 207, an Embraer E-145EU, registration UR-DNE, overruns the runway at Atatürk International Airport, Turkey and is substantially damaged.

25 March
 A Bell 206L-4 Longranger helicopter of Medair crashes at Mount Keş, Turkey, killing all six people on board.

26 March
 Arrow Air Cargo Flight 431, a McDonnell Douglas DC-1030F, suffers a major failure of the No. 2 (tail-mounted) engine shortly after take-off from Eduardo Gomes International Airport, Brazil. 12 houses and several cars were damaged by falling debris. The aircraft subsequently makes a safe landing at El Dorado International Airport, Colombia.

31 March
 A PZL M28TD Bryza 2RF operated by Marynarka Wojenna Rzeczypospolitej Polskiej crashes at Gdynia-Babie Doły Airport, Poland, during a simulated single-engine approach, killing all four people on board.

April
1 April
 Eurocopter AS332 L2 Super Puma Mk2 G-REDL of Bond Offshore Helicopters crashes in the North Sea off Scotland after the main rotor gearbox failed and all four main rotor blades were lost. All 18 people on board are killed.

2 April
 Chemtrad Aviation Britten-Norman Islander RP-C764 crashes at Baggao, Philippines, killing all thirteen people on board. The aircraft was destroyed.

3 April
 Quebec Service Aérien Canadair CL-415 C-GQBG makes a belly landing at Québec City Jean Lesage International Airport, Canada and suffers substantial damage.

4 April
 Air China Airbus A321-213 B-6556 is substantially damaged in a heavy landing and tailstrike at Beijing Capital International Airport. A vertical deceleration of 3.03G is recorded. A go-around is initiated and the aircraft subsequently lands safely.

6 April
 A Fokker F27 of the Indonesian Air Force crashes into a hangar at Husein Sastranegara International Airport, killing 24 people. A CASA CN-235 and CASA C-212 Aviocar are substantially damaged by falling debris and two Boeing 737s slightly damaged.

8 April
 SA Airlink Avro RJ-85 ZS-ASW is substantially damaged when it jumps its chocks and subsequently collides with a fence then a brick wall at OR Tambo International Airport, South Africa.

9 April
 Aviastar Mandiri BAe 146–300 PK-BRD crashes into Gunung Pike on approach to Wamena Airport, Indonesia, killing all six people on board.

15 April
 The Russian Federal Air Transport Agency cancels the operating license of airline Elbrus-Avia.

17 April
 Mimika Air Flight 514, operated by Pilatus PC-6 PK-LTJ crashes into Mount Gergaji, Indonesia, killing all ten people on board.
 TAROM ATR 42–500 YR-ATA suffers a birdstrike on approach to Iași International Airport, Romania, resulting in a large hole in the nosecone. A safe landing is subsequently made.
 Línea Turística Aereotuy Cessna 208B Grand Caravan YV-1811 crashes shortly after take-off from Canaima Airport, Venezuela, killing one of the eleven people on board.

18 April
 Royal Air Maroc Boeing 747-2B6B CN-RME is substantially damaged when it lurches forward during an engine ground run and subsequently goes through a fence at Mohammed V International Airport, Morocco.

19 April
 Canjet Flight 918, operated by Boeing 737-800 C-FTCZ is hijacked at Sangster International Airport, Jamaica. The lone hijacker is overpowered by members of the Jamaica Defense Force.
 A Kenyan Air Force Habin Y-12 crashes at Marsabit killing 14 of the 17 people on board. Among the dead are four Members of Kenya's parliament and two Deputy Ministers.
 The Russian airline Arkaim is established.

20 April
 Royal Air Maroc Flight 200, operated by Boeing 767-36NER CN-RNT, is substantially damaged in a heavy landing at John F. Kennedy International Airport. Cracks are discovered in the forward fuselage on inspection.

24 April
 The Senegalese airline Air Sénégal International suspends all operations.

25 April
Lockheed P-2V Neptune N442NA of Neptune Aviation Services crashes into a hill at Stockton, Utah, while on a ferry flight. The aircraft is destroyed and all three crew members are killed.

26 April
 Douglas DC-3C N136FS of Four Star Air Cargo is destroyed by fire at Luis Muñoz Marín International Airport, Puerto Rico.

27 April
 Magnicharters Flight 585, operated by Boeing 737-2K9 XA-MAF is damaged beyond economic repair when it makes a belly landing at Don Miguel Hidalgo y Costilla International Airport, Mexico. There are four injuries during evacuation by the 116 people on board.
 The Indonesian airline Linus Airways suspends operations as it has no aircraft to operate.

29 April
 Bako Air Boeing 737-275 TL-ADM crashes near Massamba, Democratic Republic of the Congo, killing all seven crew. The aircraft is destroyed.
 Air Arabia Maroc is founded. It will begin flight operations on 6 May.

May
 The Indonesian airline Megantara Air suspends operations.

1 May
The Fijian airline Air Fiji ceases operations.

3 May
 EV 08114, a Mil Mi-35 operated by the Venezuelan Army crashes at Táchira, Venezuela, killing all 21 personnel on board.
 XM715, a Handley Page Victor, briefly becomes airborne during a fast taxi run at Bruntingthorpe Aerodrome, United Kingdom. The aircraft is not airworthy and was not intended to have flown. YouTube video

4 May
 Northwest Airlines Flight 557, an Airbus A320-211, registration N311US, is substantially damaged in a heavy landing at Denver International Airport, United States. Vertical deceleration in excess of 3G is recorded. The aircraft may be written off.

6 May
 Air Arabia Maroc begins flight operations. Its first flight is from Casablanca, Morocco, to London Stansted Airport in the United Kingdom.
 World Airways Flight 8535, a McDonnell Douglas DC-10-30, registration N139WA, makes a hard landing at Baltimore-Washington International Thurgood Marshall Airport, United States, causing overhead panels to detach. A go-around is initiated and the aircraft subsequently lands safely. The damage to the aircraft was described as substantial.

8 May
 Saudi Arabian Airlines Flight 9061, a McDonnell Douglas MD-90-30, registration HZ-APW, departs the runway at King Khalid International Airport, Saudi Arabia, while taxiing and suffers a main gear collapse and engine fire. The damage is described as "substantial".

10 May
 YV-1467, a BAe 3201 Jetstream 31, crashes near Útila Airport, Honduras during an illegal drug smuggling flight carrying almost  of cocaine. One of the three occupants are killed.

18 May
 An Antonov An-24 veers off the runway during take-off at Aba Tenna Dejazmach Yilma International Airport, Ethiopia. Damage was described as "substantial".

20 May
 A Lockheed C-130 Hercules of the Indonesian Air Force crashes at Magetan killing 97 people on board the aircraft and a further two on the ground.

25 May

26 May
 9Q-CSA, an Antonov An-26 operated by Services Air crashes short of the runway at Matari Airport, Democratic Republic of the Congo, killing three of the four people on board. The aircraft is destroyed in the crash. It had previously been placed on a blacklist by the International Civil Aviation Organization and Antonov.

30 May
 Pakistan International Airlines Flight 668, an ATR 42–500, registration AP-BHO, departs the runway on landing at Allama Iqbal International Airport, Pakistan, resulting in a collapsed nosewheel and damaged mainwheel.

June
The Egyptian airline AlMasria Universal Airlines commences operations.

1 June
 Air France Flight 447, an Airbus A330-200, registration F-GZCP, crashes into the Atlantic Ocean off the coast of Brazil killing all 228 people on board.
 Swedish airline Air Express Sweden is taken over by MCA Airlines

2 June
 8Q-MAG, a DHC-6 Twin Otter operated by Maldavian Air Taxi is destroyed when it crashes into the sea at the Haliveli Atoll, Maldives. All seven people on board survive.

6 June
 Myanma Airways Flight 409, a Fokker F28-4000, registration XY-ADW, overruns the runway at Sittwe Airport, Myanmar. The aircraft is damaged beyond repair.

7 June
 A Strait Air Britten-Norman Islander crashes on approach to Port Hope Simpson Airport, Canada, killing the pilot. The aircraft is destroyed.

9 June
 An Indian Air Force Antonov An-32 crashes in Arunachal Pradesh province killing all thirteen people on board.

11 June
 Atlantic Southeast Airlines Flight 5414, a Canadair CRJ-200ER, registration N857AS, makes an emergency landing at Hartsfield–Jackson Atlanta International Airport, United States after an undercarriage malfunction. The aircraft is substantially damaged.

14 June
 Express Air Flight 9000, a Dornier 328, registration PK-TXN, veers off the runway on landing at Tanah Merah Airport, Indonesia. The aircraft is substantially damaged.

25 June
 Zest Airways Flight 863, a Xian MA60, registration RP-C8892, overruns the runway at Godofredo P. Ramos Airport, Philippines. The aircraft is substantially damaged but is to be repaired.

26 June
 HK-4094, a Let L-410 Turbolet operated by Transporte Aéreo de Colombia overruns the runway at Capurganá Airport, Colombia, and is substantially damaged.

27 June
 Kingfisher Airlines Flight 3334, an Airbus A320, registration VT-ADR, collides with a building at Bagdogra Airport, India. The aircraft was substantially damaged.

29 June
 PK-BRO, a DHC-6 Twin Otter operated by Aviastar Mandiri, crashes on approach to Wamena Airport, Indonesia, killing all three crew.

30 June
 Yemenia Flight 626, an Airbus A310-324, registration 7O-ADJ, crashes into the Indian Ocean near the Comoros Islands. There is one survivor from the 153 people on board.

July
 Continental Airlines begins offering its passengers in-flight access to DirecTV, with a 95-channel lineup.

3 July
 A Mil Mi-17 operated by the Pakistan Army crashes in the Federally Administered Tribal Areas, killing all 43 people on board.

5 July
 ZK-LGR, Britten-Norman Trislander operated by Great Barrier Airlines suffers an in-flight propeller disintegration, and débris penetrates the passenger cabin. An emergency landing is made at Great Barrier Aerodrome, New Zealand. No injuries are reported among the 11 people on board. The aircraft is substantially damaged.
 SU-TYB, an Antonov An-28 operated by El Dinder Aviation, is damaged beyond repair when the nosewheel collapses on landing at Saraf Omra Airfield, Sudan.

13 July

 Southwest Airlines Flight 2294, a Boeing 737-3H4, registration N387SW, suffers a structural failure of the fuselage in flight and subsequent decompression. An emergency landing is successfully made at Yeager Airport, United States.

14 July
 American airline Pet Airways commences operations.
 Airfast Indonesia, Garuda Indonesia, Mandala Airlines and Premiair are removed from the European Commission blacklist.
 The Strategic Airlift Capability consortium, composed of ten North Atlantic Treaty Organization (NATO) member countries (Bulgaria, Estonia, Hungary, Lithuania, the Netherlands, Norway, Poland, Romania, Slovenia, and the United States) and two Partnership for Peace member countries (Finland and Sweden) which have formed it to pool resources in order to operate Boeing C-17 Globemaster III aircraft for joint strategic airlift purposes, receives its first C-17 in a ceremony at the Boeing assembly plant in Long Beach, California.

15 July
 Caspian Airlines Flight 7908, a Tupolev Tu-154M, registration EP-CPG, crashes at Jannatabad, Iran, after an in-flight fire on board. All 168 people on board are killed.
 The Spanish low-cost airlines Clickair and Vueling complete their merger. with Clickair absorbed into Vueling.

16 July
 N350AN, a Boeing 767-323ER operated by American Airlines, is substantially damaged when the nosewheel collapses on the ground at Fort Worth Alliance Airport, United States, during post-maintenance checks.

19 July
 A Mil Mi-8 operated by Vertical-T crashes at Kandahar International Airport, Afghanistan killing 16 of the 21 people on board.

21 July
 Aeroméxico Flight 665, a Boeing 737-752, registration XA-NAM, suffers a nosewheel collapse on pushback at San Francisco International Airport. The aircraft is substantially damaged.

24 July
 The Italian Civil Aviation Authority suspends the operating licence of MyAir due to financial problems and service failures.
 Aria Air Flight 1525, an Ilyushin Il-62M, registration UP-I6208, crashes on landing at Mashhad International Airport, Iran, killing 16 of the 143 or more people on board.

27 July
 The Strategic Airlift Capability consortium activates its Heavy Airlift Wing to operate its C-17 Globemaster III aircraft.

28 July
The Cambodian airline Cambodia Angkor Air commences operations.

29 July
 An Airbus A330-203 operated by Air France is substantially damaged at Maya-Maya Airport, Brazil, when a wing strikes a building during ground manoeuvres.

August
2 August
 Merpati Nusantara Airlines Flight 9760, a DHC-6 Twin Otter 300, registration PK-NVC, crashes at Oksibil, Indonesia killing all 16 people on board.

3 August
 Saha Air Lines Flight 124, a Boeing 707-3J9C, registration EP-SHK, suffers engine fires in both port engines shortly after take-off from Ahwaz Airport, Iran. The fires are extinguished and a successful two-engine emergency landing is made back at the airport. The aircraft is substantially damaged.

4 August
 Bangkok Airways Flight 266, an ATR 72-212A, registration HS-PGL, overruns the runway at Saumi Airport, Thailand, and crashes into a disused control tower, killing one of the 72 people on board.

5 August
 Baitullah Mehsud, head of the Pakistani Taliban, is on a rooftop in South Waziristan, Pakistan, when an American unmanned aerial vehicle strike kills him and several other people.
SATA International Flight 466, an Airbus A320-214, registration CS-TKO, makes a very heavy landing at Lisbon Portela Airport, Portugal, with a force of 4.6G being recorded. The aircraft is substantially damaged but may have flown twice since.

7 August
The Canadian airline Island Express Air commences operations.

8 August
 N71MC, a Piper PA-32R, and N401LH, a Eurocopter AS350 collide mid-air over New York. Both aircraft crash into the Hudson River, killing all three people on board the aircraft and all six people on board the helicopter.

11 August
 Airlines PNG Flight 4684, operated by DHC-6 Twin Otter P2-MCB, crashes into a mountain in the Owen Stanley Range, Papua New Guinea, killing all 13 people on board.

14 August
The Australian airline Strategic Airlines commences operations.

16 August
 Two Sukhoi Su-27 aircraft of the Russian Knights are involved in a mid-air collision while practicing a display for the 2009 MAKS Airshow. One pilot is killed as well as one person on the ground.
 YV-212T, a Britten-Norman Islander, ditches into the sea short of Simón Bolívar International Airport, Venezuela. The aircraft is written off but all nine people on board are rescued.
 The unregistered prototype AVCEN Jetpod crashes shortly after take-off from Taiping Airport, Malaysia, killing its pilot.

20 August
 An Afriqiyah Airways aircraft (registration 5A-IAY) that serves as the personal plane of Colonel Muammar Gaddafi picks up Abelbasset al-Megrahi at Glasgow, Scotland, and flies him to Tripoli, Libya. Convicted in the December 1988 bombing of Pan American World Airways Flight 103 and serving a life sentence, Megrahi has been released from prison on compassionate grounds because he is suffering from terminal prostate cancer.

23 August
 South East Asian Airlines Flight 014, a Dornier Do-328-100, registration RP-C6328, overruns the runway on landing at Ninoy Aquino International Airport, Philippines, and is substantially damaged, but is to be repaired.
 The Danish airline Wings of Bornholm commences operations.

26 August
 TN-AIA, an Antonov An-12 operated by of Aéro-Frêt, suffers an in-flight fire, breaks up in mid-air and crashes at Brazzaville, Democratic Republic of the Congo. All six people on board are killed.

27 August
 T-906, an Ilyushin Il-76TD, of the National Air Force of Angola runs off the runway at Quatro de Fevereiro Airport, Angola, and is substantially damaged. One of the 41 people on board is injured.
 The Chinese airline East Star Air declares bankruptcy.
 The Russian airline Avianova begins operations.

29 August
A United States Air Force Boeing E-3 Sentry catches fire on landing at Nellis Air Force Base, United States. All 32 people on board are safely evacuated.

31 August
The Slovak airline SkyEurope files for bankruptcy.
The U.S. Evergreen 747 Supertanker, the world's largest aerial firefighting aircraft, see its first service in the United States, fighting the Oak Glen Fire in California.

September
1 September
The Slovak airline SkyEurope suspends operations.

2 September
 A Bell 430 helicopter crashes at Rudrakonda Hill, India, killing all five people on board, including Y. S. Rajasekhara Reddy, Chief Minister of Andhra Pradesh.

3 September
 BA CityFlyer accepts delivery of its first Embraer 170.

4 September
 Air India Flight 829, a Boeing 747-437, registration VT-ESM, suffers a fire in No.1 engine while taxiing for take-off at Chhatrapati Shivaji International Airport, India. All 229 people are successfully evacuated from the aircraft via the emergency chutes. The aircraft is substantially damaged.

7 September
 P-827, a GAF Nomad N.24A operated by the Indonesian Navy, crashes at Long Ampung Airport, killing five of the nine people on board.

8 September
 The Russian airline KD Avia suspends flight operations.

9 September
 Aeroméxico Flight 576, a Boeing 737-852, registration EI-DRA, is hijacked and landed at Mexico City International Airport, its intended destination. Five people are detained, one of whom is later identified as the hijacker.
The Egyptian airline Air Arabia Egypt announces that operations will start in late 2009 or early 2010.

11 September
 Shortly after takeoff in a Cirrus SR22 from Rock Hill/York County Airport in Rock Hill, South Carolina, American businessman William "Skipper" Beck, owner of the National Basketball Association's Charlotte Bobcats, attempts to return to the airport, but nose-dives into the taxiway, after which the plane catches fire. Beck dies instantly in the crash.

13 September
 D-ALCO, a McDonnell-Douglas MD-11 operated by Lufthansa Cargo is severely damaged in a heavy landing at Mexico City International Airport. Post landing inspection revealed that there were wrinkles in the fuselage skin and the nose gear was bent. It is reported that the aircraft may be written off.

14 September
 Lufthansa Flight 288, a Fokker 100 operated by Contact Air, registration D-AKFE, makes an emergency belly landing at Stuttgart Airport, Germany, after the undercarriage fails to deploy correctly.

18 September
 N349TA, a Casa 212 Aviocar 200 operated by Bering Air, departs the runway at Savoonga, Alaska, and is substantially damaged when the undercarriage collapses.

19 September
 The Maltese airline Efly commences operations.

22 September 
 5-8208, an Ilyushin IL76-MD operated by the Islamic Republic of Iran Air Force is involved in a mid-air collision with a Northrop F-5E Tiger II and crashes near Varamin killing all seven people on board.

24 September
 SA Airlink flight SA 8911, a BAe Jetstream 41, registration ZS-NRM, crashes shortly after take-off from Durban International Airport due to an engine failure. The aircraft is destroyed but the three crew members survive with serious injuries.

28 September 
 9044, a NAMC YS-11M-A operated by the Japanese Maritime Self Defense Force, overruns the runway upon landing at Ozuki Air Field and is substantially damaged.

29 September
 British Airways operates the first transatlantic flight from London City Airport: BA001 (a flight number unused since Concorde retired), an all-business class Airbus A318.
 Greek state-owned airline Olympic Airlines ceased operation. It was replaced by privately owned Olympic Air, which commenced operations on this day.

30 September
 The Serbian airline Jat Airways suspends flights due to a maintenance company refusing to work on their aircraft in a dispute over unpaid bills.
 American unmanned aerial vehicles have conducted 87 missile strikes against targets in Pakistan since the first recorded one on 14 June 2004. Seventy-six of them have occurred since 1 January 2008.

October
 American airlines Go! and Mokulele Airlines merge to form Go! Mokulele.
 The Greek airline Viking Hellas commences operations.
 The United States Navy successfully operates a static F414 engine (used in the F/A-18 Hornet and F/A-18E/F Super Hornet) at Naval Air Station Patuxent River, Maryland, on an aviation biofuel made from Camelina sativa.

2 October
 The Serbian airline Jat Airways resumes flights following the resolution of the dispute with their maintenance company.
 9M-MMR, a Boeing 737-4H6 operated by Malaysia Airlines, is substantially damaged when the port main undercarriage collapses while the aircraft is parked at the gate at Kuching International Airport.
The Swedish airline Feel Air is established.

9 October

 FAU-531, an CASA C-212 Aviocar operated by the Uruguayan Air Force, being operated as part of the United Nations Stabilization Mission in Haiti, crashes west of Fonds-Verettes killing all eleven on board.

15 October
 An Antonov An-28 of Blue Wing Airlines departs the runway on landing at Kwamelasemoetoe Airstrip, Suriname, and hits an obstacle. The aircraft is substantially damaged and four people are injured, one seriously.

17 October
 RP-C550, a Douglas DC-3 operated by Victoria Air, crashes shortly after take-off from Ninoy Aquino International Airport, Philippines, on a flight to Puerto Princesa International Airport after an engine malfunctions. All four people on board are killed.

21 October
 Azza Transport Flight 2241, a Boeing 707-320, crashes shortly after take-off from Sharjah International Airport, United Arab Emirates. All six crew are killed.
An agreement is announced for the sale of London Gatwick Airport from BAA Limited to Global Infrastructure Partners, to comply with Competition Commission requirements.
 Northwest Airlines Flight 188, an Airbus A320-212 with 149 people on board, lands in Minneapolis, Minnesota, an hour late after its pilots overshoot Minneapolis when they become distracted by a discussion of their schedules.

22 October
 PJ-SUN, a Britten-Norman Islander operated by Divi Divi Air, ditches off Bonaire, Netherlands Antilles. The pilot is killed but the nine passengers escape from the aircraft before it sinks.

23 October
The Slovakian airline Seagle Air ceased operations.

24 October
 Continental Airlines and Copa Airlines leave the Skyteam airline alliance.

26 October
 S-Air Flight 9607, a BAe 125, registration RA-02807, crashes on approach to Minsk International Airport. All three crew and both passengers are killed.

27 October
 Continental Airlines joins the Star Alliance airline alliance.

November
1 November
 An Ilyushin Il-76 operated by the Russian Ministry of Internal Affairs crashed shortly after take-off from Mirny Airport. All eleven crew are killed.
 Continental Airlines begins new daily nonstop service from George Bush Intercontinental Airport in Houston, Texas, to Edmonton International Airport in Edmonton, Alberta, Canada; from Houston and Cleveland, Ohio, to Washington Dulles International Airport in Virginia; and daily nonstop service from Houston to Frankfurt-am-Main, Germany.

3 November
 UM-239, a Xian MA60 operated by Air Zimbabwe, hits five warthogs on take-off from Harare International Airport. The take-off is rejected but the undercarriage collapses causing substantial damage to the aircraft.

5 November
 N120FB, a Grumman Albatross operated by Albatross Adventures, crashes shortly after take-off from St. Lucie County International Airport, Fort Pierce, Florida, after suffering an engine failure. The aircraft was damaged beyond economic repair.

7 November
All eleven crew are missing, presumed dead.

10 November
 Kingfisher Airlines Flight 4124, operated by ATR 72-212A VT-KAC skidded off the runway after landing at Chhatrapati Shivaji International Airport. The aircraft suffered substantial damage but all 46 passengers and crew escaped unharmed.
Mexicana, MexicanaClick, and MexicanaLink join the Oneworld airline alliance.

11 November
 The Swedish airline  MCA Airlines declares bankruptcy.

12 November
 Rwandair Flight 205 operated by Canadair CRJ-100 5Y-JLD ended up embedded in the departure building at Kigali International Airport after an engine malfunction. One passenger was killed.
 Over Lake Elsinore, California, 68 wingsuit jumpers set a U.S. national record for the largest wingsuit formation. No criteria yet exist with which to officially declare it a world record; the Fédération Aéronautique Internationale will not develop such criteria until February 2015.

14 November
 English Electric Lightning T5 ZU-BEX crashed during an airshow at AFB Overberg, Bredasdorp, South Africa after a hydraulic failure, killing the pilot.

18 November
 Iran Air Fokker 100 EP-CFO suffers an undercarriage malfunction on take-off from Isfahan International Airport. The aircraft is on a flight to Mehrabad Airport, Tehran when the undercarriage fails to retract. The aircraft lands at Isfahan but suffers substantial damage when the left main gear collapses.

19 November
 Compagnie Africaine d'Aviation Flight 3711, operated by McDonnell Douglas MD-82 9Q-CAB overran the runway on landing at Goma International Airport, suffering substantial damage. The overrun area was contaminated by solidified lava.
 A de Havilland Canada DHC-8-200 being operated on behalf of United States Africa Command was substantially damaged when the undercarriage collapsed and the starboard wing was ripped off in an emergency landing at Tarakigné, Mali.

20 November
 Interlink Airlines commences first every passenger flights from Wonderboom Airport outside Pretoria, South Africa. This is the first time the South African capital is connected to other centres in South Africa, instead of using OR Tambo International, Johannesburg. Flights started with 737-200 aircraft, although the runway is inadequate for these aircraft, so severe weight penalties, supposed to use BAe146 aircraft in the near future. Currently flights only to Cape Town and Durban

23 November
 Italian Air Force Lockheed KC-130J Hercules MM62176 crashes just after take-off from Galileo Galilei Airport, Pisa. All five crew members are killed.

24 November
 Batavia Air Flight 711, operated by a Boeing 737-400 made an emergency landing at El Tari Airport, Kupang after a problem is discovered with its landing gear.

27 November
 The European Commission extends its blacklist to cover all airlines based in Djibouti, the Republic of the Congo and São Tomé. In Ukraine, Ukrainian Cargo Airways and Volare Airlines were removed from the blacklist as their Air Operator's Certificates had been revoked. Motor Sich Airlines were also removed from the blacklist and Ukrainian-Mediterranean Airlines were allowed to operate a single aircraft. TAAG Angola Airlines was allowed to increase the number of aircraft used for flights to Portugal.

28 November
 Avient Aviation Flight 324, operated by McDonnell Douglas MD-11F Z-BAV, crashed on take-off from Shanghai Pudong International Airport on a flight to Bishkek–Manas International Airport, Kyrgyzstan with the loss of 3 lives. The plane was written off.

December
 The United Kingdom-based airline East African Air commences operations.

2 December
Merpati Nusantara Airlines Fokker 100 PK-MJD makes an emergency landing at El Tari Airport, Kupang when the left main gear fails to extend. There are no injuries among the passengers and crew.

3 December
T*he first Solar Impulse aircraft, HB-SIA, the first solar-powered aircraft capable of flying both day and night thanks to batteries charged by solar power that provide it with power during darkness, makes its first flight, a short hop of 350 meters (1,148 feet) at an altitude of 1 meter (3.28 feet) at Dubendorf, Switzerland.

7 December
SA Airlink Flight 8625, operated by Embraer ERJ 135 ZS-SJW overruns the runway at George Airport, South Africa, arriving from Cape Town. The aircraft sustains substantial damage when it runs down a bank onto a road and may be declared a write-off.

8 December
In the United Kingdom, Coventry Airport announces that it is to close with immediate effect due to its owners being wound up in the High Court.

9 December
Brussels Airlines joins the Star Alliance.

14 December
Cabin crew at British Airways vote overwhelmingly in favour of a planned 12 days of strike action over Christmas and the New Year in a dispute over job cuts and changes to staff contracts. On 17 December the High Court rules that Unite, the representing trade union, had not correctly balloted its members on the strike action, meaning that the strikes could not go ahead.

16 December
Scotland's largest airline, Flyglobespan, enters administration and ceases all flights.

18 December
Continental Micronesia inaugurates new service from Guam and Honolulu to Nadi, Fiji.

19 December
A Hawker Siddeley HS 748 overruns the runway at Tonj Airfield, Southern Sudan, killing one person on the ground. The aircraft is carrying security personnel in preparation for a visit from President Salva Kiir Mayardit.

21 December
The Spanish airline Air Comet ceases operations.

22 December
 American Airlines Flight 331, a Boeing 737-800, overshoots the runway on landing at Norman Manley International Airport, Kingston, Jamaica, injuring 15 of the 154 people on board.

25 December
 Northwest Airlines Flight 253, operated by Airbus A330-323E N820NW is subjected to an attempted terrorist attack. The terrorist, Nigerian Islamist Abdulfarouk Umar Muttalab, is overpowered by other passengers and is arrested when the aircraft lands at Detroit Metropolitan Wayne County Airport.

Deaths
13 January
 Australian aviator Nancy Bird Walton, 93.

8 February
 American aviator Wesley L. McDonald, 84.

2 June
 British Air Vice-Marshal John Ernsting, 81.

20 June
 American aviator Kenneth L. Reusser, 89.

18 July
 British World War I veteran and last surviving founding member of the Royal Air Force, Henry Allingham, 113.

First flights
25 April
Boeing P-8 Poseidon

21 October
BAE Systems Mantis

12 November
AgustaWestland AW159 Wildcat

13 November
AgustaWestland AW149

25 November
 Gulfstream G650.

3 December
 First Solar Impulse aircraft, HB-SIA.

4 December
Eurocopter EC175

9 December
Elbit Hermes 900

11 December
 Airbus A400M, in Spain.
Gulfstream G250.

15 December
Boeing 787 Dreamliner, in Seattle.

Entered service
 Evergreen 747 Supertanker, fighting a fire in Spain's Province of Cuenca.

Retirements
 31 July – Cessna T-37 Tweet by the United States Air Force

References

 
Aviation by year